The Kumul Depression, also known as the Hami Depression,, is a basin in eastern Xinjiang, China.

The climate of the area is considered to be arid, with large seasonal differences in temperature. The city of Kumul, also known as Hami, lies within the basin and is known for producing the Hami melon, grapes, and other fruit produce. The basin has extensive oil resources.

Landforms of Xinjiang
Depressions (geology)